Hoseynabad (also Romanized as Ḩoseynābād) is a village in Iran, located in Gasht Rural District, in the Central District of Fuman County, Gilan Province. At the 2006 census, its population was 565, in 149 families.

References 

Populated places in Fuman County